Khongman is a census town in Imphal East district in the Indian state of Manipur.

Demographics
 India census, Khongman had a population of 5465. Males constitute 48% of the population and females 52%. Khongman has an average literacy rate of 76%, higher than the national average of 59.5%: male literacy is 83%, and female literacy is 69%. In Khongman, 9% of the population is under 6 years of age.

References

Cities and towns in Imphal East district
Imphal East district